Samanya Upanishads or Samanya Vedanta Upanishads are minor Upanishads of Hinduism that are of a generic nature. They were composed later and are classified separate from the thirteen major Principal Upanishads considered to be more ancient and connected to the Vedic tradition.

The Samanya Upanishad as group contrast with other minor Upanishads grouped as the Yoga Upanishads which are related to Yoga, the Sannyasa Upanishads which are related to Hindu renunciation and monastic practice, the Shaiva Upanishads which are related to Shaivism, the Vaishnava Upanishads which are related to Vaishnavism, and the Shakta Upanishads which are related to Shaktism.

The Samanya Vedanta Upanishads are variously classified, ranging from a list of 21 to 24. The variation in count is based on whether some of the older Principal Upanishads are included as Samanya. Some include three ancient Upanishads as Samanya Upanishads bringing the list to 24: 14. Shvetashvatara Upanishad; 24. Maitrayaniya Upanishad; and 25. Kaushitaki Upanishad. If these three are included as Samanya Upanishads, the list of Principal Upanishads shrinks to ten. Many scholars, however, consider the Principal Upanishads to be thirteen.

Nomenclature
The term samanya literally means "generic, universal".

Date
The Principal Upanishads are dated to be between eighth and first century BCE, the estimates for the minor Upanishads vary. According to Mahony, the minor Upanishads are approximately dated to be from about 100 BC to 1100 AD.

List of 21 Samanya Upanishads

List of 24 Samanya Upanishads
The list of Samanya Upanishad varies by the scholar. For example, Brahmayogin's list of 24 included Annapurna Upanishad, Maitri Upanishad and Kaushitaki Upanishad as Samanya Upanishads.

See also
Hindu texts
Vedas

References

Bibliography

Upanishads